William Burns was a 22-year-old African-American man who was lynched on October 6, 1907, in Cumberland, Maryland for the alleged murder of white Cumberland police officer August Baker.

Several newspapers at the time account that Officer Baker attempted to arrest Burns, and that Burns allegedly resisted and shot Baker in a scuffle. Burns was then arrested and taken to the Cumberland Jail. Several days later, Baker died in hospital and a mob of men with their coats turned inside out and handkerchiefs over their faces gathered outside the jail at 12:40am. The mob tore down a telegraph pole and used it to batter down the doors to the jail. One account reports that Burns was dragged out of his cell after the deputy on duty handed over the keys to the cell at gunpoint. Burns was taken outside "peppered with bullets" and left to die. The crowd wanted to hang Burns, but they could not find a rope.

The Allegany County Commissioners offered a reward of $500 for the arrest and conviction of the people who took Burns from the jail. Benjamin A. Richmond, an associate of Governor Lloyd Lowndes, Jr. stated that a number of prominent men from Cumberland and vicinity were involved in the lynching.

References

1907 deaths
1907 in Maryland
Allegany County, Maryland
Lynching deaths in Maryland
Racially motivated violence against African Americans
October 1907 events
1907 murders in the United States